The Men's 100 metres C3-4 was a track event in athletics at the 1992 Summer Paralympics, for visually impaired athletes. It consisted of two semi-finals and a final.

Results

Final

References 

Men's 100 metres C3-4